"How Will I Rest in Peace if I'm Buried by a Highway?" (stylized in all lowercase) is a song by American musician Kenneth La'ron, under the name KennyHoopla. It was released as the self-titled single from the EP of the same name on February 4, 2020 through Arista Records. It was KennyHoopla's first single to chart, reaching number 8 in the Billboard Alternative Airplay chart.

Background and release 
The track was written and recorded in mid-to-late 2019 and written by La'ron. When describing the song and the songwriting process, La'ron said "There's an aura about indie rock music, and a sound and energy that I can't explain, but I feel like I have it in me. It was cool that it came out and other people are feeling it. It was written in a place in which I felt super doubtful".

The song and the corresponding was released on February 4, 2020, for streaming and radio platforms.

Music and lyrics 
The song is performed in a E major key. It is performed in a 4/4 time signature at a tempo of 160 beats per minute, although it can be altered to a half-time of 80 beats per minute.

Commercial performance 
"How Will I Rest in Peace if I'm Buried by a Highway?" became La'ron's first single to chart, ultimately reaching the number eight spot in the Billboard magazine's Alternative Airplay chart in July 2020.

Music video 
The music video for the single was also released on February 4, 2020. The video transitions between scenes of La'ron signing along on a checkboard dance floor, a crowded house party, and by a vehicle that has crashed alongside a rural road. The music video was directed by Cody LaPlant and Damien Blue.

Track listing

Chart positions

Personnel 
Music video
The following individuals were credited with editing, director, and filming the music video:
 Cody LaPlant & Damien Blue — Director, Editor, Color
 Kyle Kadow — Cinematographer
 Emmanuil Morari — First assistant camera
 Spencer Ortega — Gaffer
 Xavier Whitaker, Steven Cleavland, and Eddie Barrioneuvo — Grip
 Will Storm — Art director
 Asher Klaven — Assistant art director
 Brema Brema — Behind the scenes

References 

2020 singles
2020 songs
KennyHoopla songs
Songs written by KennyHoopla
Arista Records singles